The speaker of the Chhattisgarh Legislative Assembly is the presiding officer of the Legislative Assembly of Chhattisgarh, the main law-making body for the Indian state of Chhattisgarh. He is elected by the members of the Chhattisgarh Legislative Assembly. The speaker is always a member of the Legislative Assembly.

List

References

Lists of legislative speakers in India
Speakers of the Chhattisgarh Legislative Assembly
Chhattisgarh-related lists